Nelly Carolina Tejera (born 14 October 1976) is a Venezuelan model and actress. She is best known for her role as Eva Granados in Venevision's telenovela Gata Salvaje.
Her mother  Elizabeth Guyana and father Fransiz Tejera. She has one sister  Lisa Tejera.

Personal life
On 4 March 2006, Tejera married Costa Rican businessman Don Stockwell. On 2 August 2006, she gave birth to her first child, a boy. The couple separated in 2011.

Filmography

References

External links
 

1976 births
Living people
Actresses from Caracas
Venezuelan telenovela actresses
Venezuelan female models
Venezuelan people of Mexican descent
Venezuelan people of Spanish descent